Ivica Burić (born 5 April 1963) is a Croatian professional basketball coach and former player.

He is best known for winning the FIBA European Champions Cup in 1989.

References

http://sportnetmanager.com/coaches-details.php?id=39

Living people
1963 births
Apollon Patras B.C. coaches
Croatian basketball coaches
Croatian men's basketball players
KK Split coaches
KK Split players
KK Šibenik players
KK Zadar coaches
Basketball players from Split, Croatia
KK Dubrava coaches